Polar Shift is the sixth book in the NUMA Files series of books co-written by best-selling author Clive Cussler and Paul Kemprecos, and was published in 2005. The main character of this series is Kurt Austin.

In this novel geologic polar shift is connected with magnetic polar shift, based on the supposed theories of Laszlo Kovacs, a student of real life Nikola Tesla.

The NUMA Files
2005 American novels
G. P. Putnam's Sons books
Collaborative novels